Iryna Volodymyrivna Koliadenko (born 28 August 1998) is a Ukrainian freestyle wrestler. She won one of the bronze medals in the women's freestyle 62 kg event at the 2020 Summer Olympics held in Tokyo, Japan.

In 2019, she won the silver medal at the World Wrestling Championships held in Nur-Sultan, Kazakhstan in the women's freestyle 65 kg event. She is also a gold medalist at the European Wrestling Championships.

Career 

In 2018 and 2019, she won the bronze medal in the women's freestyle 65 kg event both at the 2018 World U23 Wrestling Championship and 2019 World U23 Wrestling Championship, held in Bucharest, Romania and Budapest, Hungary, respectively.

In 2020, she won one of the bronze medals in the 65 kg event at the European Wrestling Championships held in Rome, Italy. In her bronze medal match she defeated Kriszta Incze of Romania. In March 2021, she qualified at the European Qualification Tournament to compete at the 2020 Summer Olympics in Tokyo, Japan. A month later, she won the gold medal in the 62 kg event at the 2021 European Wrestling Championships held in Warsaw, Poland. She defeated Marianna Sastin of Hungary in the final.

She won one of the bronze medals in the women's freestyle 62 kg event at the 2020 Summer Olympics held in Tokyo, Japan. She defeated Anastasija Grigorjeva of Latvia in her bronze medal match.

In 2022, she won the gold medal in her event at the Matteo Pellicone Ranking Series 2022 held in Rome, Italy. She won one of the bronze medals in her event at the 2023 Ibrahim Moustafa Tournament held in Alexandria, Egypt.

Major results

References

External links 

 

Living people
Ukrainian female sport wrestlers
World Wrestling Championships medalists
European Wrestling Championships medalists
Wrestlers at the 2020 Summer Olympics
1998 births
Olympic wrestlers of Ukraine
Medalists at the 2020 Summer Olympics
Olympic medalists in wrestling
Olympic bronze medalists for Ukraine
People from Irpin
European Wrestling Champions
Sportspeople from Kyiv Oblast
21st-century Ukrainian women